Sclerolaena parviflora (common names -  Mallee copper burr, Small-flower saltbush) is a species of flowering plant in the family Amaranthaceae, found in every mainland state and territory of  Australia. It was first described in 1923 by Robert Henry Anderson as Bassia parviflora, but was transferred to the genus, Sclerolaena in 1978 by Andrew John Scott. 

It is found in the central and southern areas of Australia.

Gallery

References

External links
Scleroalaena parviflora occurrence data from GBIF

parviflora
Endemic flora of Australia
Plants described in 1923
Taxa named by Robert Henry Anderson